Humphrey Kelleher (1946–2005) was an Irish sportsperson. He played Gaelic football with his local club Millstreet and was a member of the Cork senior inter-county team from 1971 until 1975.

Playing career

Club
Kelleher played his club football with his local club in Millstreet.

Inter-county
By the late 1960s Kelleher had joined the Cork senior team, however, the team was forced to play second fiddle to Kerry.  In 1971 Cork were back.  A 0–25 to 0–14 trouncing of back-to-back All-Ireland champions Kerry gave Kelleher a Munster winners' medal.  Cork, however, were later defeated by eventual champions Offaly in the All-Ireland semi-final.

Two years later Kelleher secured his second Munster winners' medal.  The 5–12 to 1–15 defeat of Kerry showed the traditional football powers that Cork were coming.  The subsequent All-Ireland final pitted Cork against Galway.  Jimmy Barry-Murphy scored the first of his two goals after two minutes before scored a third for Cork after switching to left wing-forward.  At full-time Cork were the champions by 3–17 to 2–13.  This victory gave Kelleher an All-Ireland winners' medal.

Cork continued their provincial dominance in 1974.  A 1–11 to 0–7 defeat of Kerry gave Kelleher a third Munster winners' medal.  This victory resulted in Cork being installed as the favourites to retain their All-Ireland title.  Kelleher's side were defeated by eventual champions Dublin in the All-Ireland semi-final.

Inter-provincial
Kelleher also lined out with Munster in the inter-provincial football competition.  He first played with his province in 1974. In 1975 Kelleher was a member of the team again and he captured a Railway Cup winners' medal following a victory over Ulster.  Kelleher was a non-playing substitute when Munster retained the title in 1976.

Death
Humphrey Kelleher died on 21 September 2005, after a short illness.

References

1946 births
2005 deaths
Millstreet Gaelic footballers
Cork inter-county Gaelic footballers
Munster inter-provincial Gaelic footballers